This article lists events from the year 2007 in France.

Incumbents
 President: Jacques Chirac (until 17 May), Nicolas Sarkozy (starting 17 May)
 Prime Minister: Dominique de Villepin (until 17 May), François Fillon (starting 17 May)

Events

January – March
5 January – Citroën officially launches the Citroën C4 Picasso range of MPV's.
1 March – Airbus announces that it will cease work indefinitely on the A380F freight aircraft.

April – June
22 April – The first round of the presidential election takes place.
6 May – Nicolas Sarkozy is elected President, defeating Ségolène Royal with 53% of the vote in the Presidential Election.
16 May – Sarkozy officially becomes President after taking over from Jacques Chirac.
10 June – The first round of Legislative elections is held.
15 June – The all-new Renault Twingo goes on sale in France as well as Italy, Slovenia and the rest of Europe. The old Twingo is set to cease production on 28 June.
17 June – The second round of Legislative elections is held.

July – September
15 July – Vélib' bicycle-sharing system introduced in Paris.

October – December
24–25 October – Grenelle de l'Environnement Conferences.
30 October – 2007 Zoé's Ark controversy: Six members of charity organization Zoé's Ark are formally charged by the government of Chad for child abduction.
2 November: In Strasbourg the Tomi Ungerer Museum opens.
25 November – Riots continue for a second night in Val-d'Oise, following the death of two youths in a motorcycle collision with a police vehicle.
6 December – A pipe bomb explodes in a law office in Paris, killing one person.
26 December – Six members of the Zoé's Ark group are convicted and sentenced to eight years of forced labour, although they will be able to serve the time in France.

Full date unknown
Association Pesinet, French NGO is founded.

Births

Deaths

January
9 January – Jean-Pierre Vernant, historian and anthropologist (born 1914).
11 January – Solveig Dommartin, actress (born 1961).
13 January – Henri-Jean Martin, historian of the book and printing (born 1924).
15 January – Colette Caillat, professor of Sanskrit and comparative grammar (born 1921).
20 January – Éric Aubijoux, motorcycle racer (born 1964).
22 January – Abbé Pierre, priest and founder of Emmaus movement (born 1912).
24 January – Jean-François Deniau, statesman, diplomat, essayist and novelist (born 1928).
26 January – Charles Brunier, convicted murderer and veteran of the First and Second World Wars who claimed to have been the inspiration for Papillon (born 1901).
26 January – Jean Ichbiah, computer scientist (born 1940).
27 January – Philippe Lacoue-Labarthe, philosopher, literary critic, and translator (born 1940).

February
2 February – Gisèle Pascal, actress (born 1921).
5 February – Liliane Ackermann, community leader, writer, and lecturer (born 1938).
17 February – Jean Duvignaud, novelist and sociologist (born 1921).
17 February – Maurice Papon, Vichy government official, prefect of police of Paris (born 1910).

March
1 March – Colette Brosset, actress, writer and choreographer (born 1922).
2 March – Henri Troyat, author, biographer, historian and novelist (born 1911).
6 March – Jean Baudrillard, philosopher and sociologist (born 1929).
6 March – Pierre Moinot, novelist (born 1920).
13 March – Nicole Stéphane, actress, producer and director (born 1923).
14 March – Lucie Aubrac, World War II Resistance fighter (born 1912).
14 March – Roger Beaufrand, Olympic gold medal winning cyclist (born 1908).
15 March – Jean Talairach, neurosurgeon (born 1911).

April
9 April – Alain Etchegoyen, philosopher and novelist (born 1951).
11 April – Loïc Leferme, free diver (born 1970).
12 April – Pierre Probst, cartoonist (born 1913).
14 April – René Rémond, historian and political economist (born 1918).
17 April – Raymond Kaelbel, international soccer player (born 1932).
19 April – Jean-Pierre Cassel, actor (born 1932).
30 April – Grégory Lemarchal, singer (born 1983).

May
18 May – Pierre-Gilles de Gennes, physicist and the Nobel Prize laureate in Physics in 1991 (born 1932).
30 May – Jean-Claude Brialy, actor and director (born 1933).
30 May – Emmanuel Hostache, bobsledder (born 1975).

June
12 June – Guy de Rothschild, banker (born 1909).
26 June – Lucien Hervé, photographer (born 1910).

July
3 July – Claude Pompidou, philanthropist, wife of President of France Georges Pompidou (born 1912).
5 July – Régine Crespin, opera singer (born 1927).
22 July – Jean Stablinski, racing cyclist (born 1932).
29 July – Michel Serrault, actor (born 1928).
July – François Bruhat, mathematician (born 1929).

August
5 August – Henri Amouroux, historian and journalist (born 1920).
5 August – Jean-Marie Lustiger, Roman Catholic Archbishop of Paris and Cardinal (born 1926).
5 August – Janine Niépce, photographer (born 1921).
6 August – Élie de Rothschild, banker (born 1917).
10 August – Jean Rédélé, automotive pioneer, pilot and founder of automotive brand Alpine (born 1922).
11 August – Maurice Boitel, painter (born 1919).
21 August – Caroline Aigle, first woman fighter pilot in the French Air Force (born 1974).
25 August – Raymond Barre, politician and economist, Prime Minister (born 1924).
29 August – Pierre Messmer, Gaullist politician and Prime Minister (born 1916).

September
8 September – Jean-François Bizot, journalist and writer (born 1944).
14 September – Jacques Martin, television presenter and producer (born 1933).
15 September – Marie-Simone Capony, teacher, fifth-oldest person in the world (born 1894).
19 September – Maia Simon, actress (born 1939).
22 September – André Gorz, journalist and social philosopher (born 1923).
22 September – Marcel Marceau, mime artist (born 1923).
28 September – René Desmaison, mountaineer, climber and alpinist (born 1930).

October
1 October – Bernard Delaire, last French naval veteran of the First World War (born 1899).
5 October – Alexandra Boulat, photographer (born 1962).
13 October – Bob Denard, mercenary (born 1929).
14 October – Raymond Pellegrin, actor (born 1925).
22 October – Ève Curie, author and writer, daughter of Marie and Pierre Curie (born 1904).
24 October – Jules Bigot, soccer player and manager (born 1915).
29 October – Christian d'Oriola, Olympic gold medal winning foil fencer (born 1928).

November
3 November – Maurice Noël Léon Couve de Murville, Roman Catholic Archbishop of Birmingham (born 1929).
16 November – Pierre Granier-Deferre, film director (born 1927).
19 November – André Bettencourt, Resistance fighter, politician and Minister (born 1919).
22 November – Maurice Béjart, choreographer who ran the Béjart Ballet Lausanne (born 1927).
28 November – Fred Chichin, musician and songwriter (born 1954).
30 November – François-Xavier Ortoli, politician, businessman, Minister and President of the European Commission (born 1925).

December
13 December – Philippe Clay, mime artist, singer and actor (born 1927).
13 December – Alain Payet, adult film director (born 1947).
15 December – Jean Bottéro, historian (born 1914).
16 December – Serge Vinçon, politician (born 1949).
22 December – Julien Gracq, writer (born 1910).
22 December – Lucien Teisseire, road bicycle racer (born 1919).

References

Links

2000s in France